Steffen Heidrich (born 19 July 1967) is a German former professional footballer who played as an attacking midfielder.

Career

As a player

In his youth Steffen Heidrich played for BSG Messgeräte Beierfeld and in 1980 he began his career with FC Karl-Marx-Stadt, and quickly became an important first-team player, as the club enjoyed relative success in the late 1980s. He earned one cap for East Germany, as a substitute for Rico Steinmann in a match against Egypt shortly before reunification. From December 1984, Heidrich played 128 games for FCK and its successor Chemnitzer FC in the GDR Oberliga, scoring 31 goals. He was an important part of the team which experienced its most successful time in the late 1980s after the 1966/67 championship season. He stayed at Chemnitzer FC (as the club was now renamed), playing in the 2. Bundesliga until 1993, when he joined VfB Leipzig, just promoted to the Bundesliga. Heidrich played thirty times in the Bundesliga scoring four goals, as VfB were relegated. He remained with the club for four years, where he was a regular first-team player and a consistent goalscorer. However, they suffered a second relegation in 1998, and Heidrich moved on to FC Energie Cottbus, who had been promoted in their place. He captained Energie to their first ever promotion to the Bundesliga in 2000, but only made two appearances in the top flight, and left at the end of the 2000–01 season, joining Dynamo Dresden. He helped Dynamo earn promotion to the 2. Liga in 2004, but injury restricted him to just eight appearances, and he retired in 2005.

As a manager
Heidrich then took up the role of general manager at Dynamo Dresden, and later Energie Cottbus. In 2012, he became sporting director of Erzgebirge Aue. From 1 June 2006 to 10 August 2009, the former leading player took over the position of manager in Lausitz. With his resignation as manager, he assumed responsibility for the relegation to the 2nd division. On 9 January 2012, FC Erzgebirge Aue introduced Heidrich as the new sports director in a press conference. After the team had only picked up one point from five games, the club announced the separation from Heidrich on 4 March 2013.

Private life
Heidrich is married to a lawyer and has a daughter (born in 2004). He lives with his family in Dresden-Langebrück. At the TU Dresden he completed his studies as a club manager.

Literature

 Andreas Baingo, Michael Hohlfied: GDR football selection players. The encyclopaedia. Sports Publisher Berlin, Berlin 2000, page 62,63
 Michael Horn, Gottfried Weise: The big encyclopaedia of  East German football. Schwarzkopf and Schwarzkopf, Berlin 2004, page 148

References

External links 

 
 
 

1967 births
Living people
People from Erzgebirgskreis
German footballers
East German footballers
East Germany international footballers
Association football midfielders
Bundesliga players
2. Bundesliga players
Chemnitzer FC players
1. FC Lokomotive Leipzig players
FC Energie Cottbus players
Dynamo Dresden players
TU Dresden alumni
Dynamo Dresden non-playing staff
DDR-Oberliga players
Footballers from Saxony